Balacra belga is a moth of the family Erebidae. It was described by Sergius G. Kiriakoff in 1954. It is found in the Democratic Republic of the Congo.

References

Balacra
Moths described in 1954
Insects of the Democratic Republic of the Congo
Erebid moths of Africa
Endemic fauna of the Democratic Republic of the Congo